Albert Collins is an American musician

Albert Collins may also refer to:

 Albert Collins (footballer) (1899–1969), English footballer
 Albert Collins (painter) (1883–1951), Australian painter, teacher and actor
 Albert Collins (politician) (1868–1956), New South Wales politician

See also
Al "Jazzbo" Collins (Albert Collins, 1919–1997), American disc jockey